Badal Patralekh is an Indian politician from the Congress. He is the current Minister for Agriculture in the Government of Jharkhand.

He is the current MLA of the Jarmundi constituency, representing Congress party.

Jharkhand Legislative Assembly

References

Living people
Year of birth missing (living people)
Indian National Congress politicians from Jharkhand